The Sound of Magic is a 2022 South Korean streaming television series based on the Naver webtoon Annarasumanara by Ha Il-kwon. Directed by Kim Seong-yoon and written by Kim Min-jeong, starring Ji Chang-wook, Choi Sung-eun, and Hwang In-youp. It tells the story of a mysterious magician, Ri Eul suddenly appearing in front of a girl who lost her dream, Yoon Ah-yi and a boy who is forced to dream, Na Il-deung. The series was released on May 6, 2022 exclusively by Netflix.

Synopsis

The Sound of Magic is an emotional music drama that revolves around Yoon Ah-yi, a poor student attending Sewoon High School, who has diminished her belief in magic, which she had a passion for when she was younger. Under many misfortunes, she wishes to grow faster to become an adult, so she can escape the major stressors and debts, which weigh her down. She then meets Ri Eul, an adult magician who wants to remain as a so-called 'child'. Under despise and suspicion from the whole community, he aims to claim he is a real magician, asking whoever he meets "Do you believe in magic?" After being a frequent visitor of Ri Eul's residence (which is at an eerily, abandoned amusement park), Ah-yi's deskmate Na Il-deung, who is a cold and well off student, starts to eavesdrop on her magic lessons with the magician, soon beginning to show a liking towards her and magic tricks. In all, Ah-yi's life gradually changes as she becomes a follower of Ri Eul, making herself again a believer in magic and further deciding to follow her dreams in earnest.

Cast

Main
 Ji Chang-wook as Ri Eul / Ryu Min-hyuk
 Nam Da-reum as young Ryu Min-hyuk
  A mysterious magician who lives in an abandoned amusement park. He wants to remain as a child even after becoming an adult.
 Choi Sung-eun as Yoon Ah-yi
 Joo Ye-rim as young Yoon Ah-yi
 A poor high school girl, who lives alone with her younger sister, and wants to become an adult more sooner than later. She struggles to make a living.
 Hwang In-youp as Na Il-deung
 Choi Seung-hoon as young Na Il-deung
 A gifted and wealthy high school boy who comes across as cold and silent, always being immersed in his studies. He is Ah-yi's classmate, and develops a liking towards her. However his life and career have changed after meeting Min-hyuk.

Supporting

Yoon Ah-yi's family
 Jo Han-chul as Yoon Ah-yi's father
 Hong Jung-min as Yoon Yoo-yi, Yoon Ah-yi's younger sister

Na Il-deung's family
 Yoo Jae-myung as Na Il-deung's father
 Kim Hye-eun as Na Il-deung's mother

Sewoon High School
 Ji Hye-won as Baek Ha-na, classmate of Yoon Ah-yi and Na Il-deung
 Kim Bo-yoon as Kim So-hee, classmate of Yoon Ah-yi and Na Il-deung
 Oh So-hyun as Seo Ha-yoon, classmate of Yoon Ah-yi and Na Il-deung
 Lim Ki-hong as homeroom teacher

Others
 Yoon Kyung-ho as Kim Doo-shik, convenience store owner
 Choi Young-joon as Detective Kim
 Kim Bada as Detective Park
 Park Ha-na as Min Ji-soo
 Hong Seo-hee as young Min Ji-soo
 Yoon Sa-bong as Yoon Ah-yi's landlady
 Ryu Kyung-soo as part-time employee at convenience store
 Park Seul-gi as Bella, Ri Eul's parrot (voice appearance)
 Woo Mi-hwa as Seo Ha-yeon’s Mother.

Episodes

Production

Development
The series reunited director Kim Seong-yoon and writer Kim Min-jeong who previously worked together in the 2016 drama Love in the Moonlight. The series was choreographed by Hong Se-jeong of the musicals Phantom and Laughing Man, while illusionist Lee Eun-gyeol served as the magic advisor. Music director Park Seong-il and lyricist Kim Eana were in charge of the music. Ji Chang-wook practiced magic for three months to play his role.

Casting
In December 2020, it was announced that Ji Chang-wook was offered the role of the magician in the series. In the same month, Hwang In-youp was also reported to have been offered the role of Na Il-deung. In February 2021, it was reported that Choi Sung-eun was in talks to appear in the drama as Yoon Ah-yi. In April 2021, Netflix officially announced production as well as casting confirmation with Ji Chang-wook, Choi Sung-eun, and Hwang In-yeop.

Filming
On July 26, 2021 it was reported that Ji Chang-wook and one of the staff tested positive for COVID-19. As the actor is self quarantined as per protocol, the filming for the series was suspended. On August 11, 2021 filming resumed as it was reported that Ji Chang-wook has recovered from COVID-19. Filming ended in September 2021.

Music
The music of this fantasy music drama was composed by music director Park Seong-il and lyrics are by Kim Eana, Seo Dong-seong, and Lee Chi-hoon. The production team worked together to create the music for 18 months. Director Park Seong-il said, "Once the script was completed, I started composing and took singing lessons for the actors during meetings." Praising the enthusiasm and hard work of the actors during the work period, he said, "I recorded every day for over a year. I needed concentration every moment enough to practice like a recording." Choi Sung-eun said, "As singing was a task, I went to the recording studio every day." Ji Chang-wook said that he worked while talking a lot with the production team about "how to express the emotions of the characters at the point where there was transition to the music in the play."

Soundtrack
The OST is composed by Park Seong-il on the lyrics of Kim Eana. Aside from Park Seong-il and Kim Eana, the drama's OST was also recorded with the Czech National Symphony Orchestra. The string recording was done in the second half of 2021 alongside composer Kim Seon Kyong.

Pre-released OST titled "Annarasumanara", rendered by Ji Chang-wook and Choi Sung-eun was released by Vlending Co., Ltd, on April 28, 2022. The full OST was officially released simultaneously with the worldwide release of the series on May 6.

Tracklist

Reception

Audience response
The Sound of Magic was ranked 7th globally in the Netflix TV shows (Non-English) category, one day after its release. On May 11, it ranked no 3 in South Korea, and globally it was at 4th place in the Netflix TV shows (Non-English) category.

Critical response
The review aggregator website Rotten Tomatoes reported a 100% approval rating, based on 5 reviews with an average rating of 7.10/10.

Jonathon Wilson of Ready Steady Cut graded the TV series with 3 stars out of 5 and praised technical aspect writing, "[the series has] lovely visuals, solid performances, impressive song-and-dance numbers, and oodles of charm". Summarising his review Wilson said that the series "has all the right elements, or at least most of them, but there’s just a little spark of magic missing that prevents the illusion from really lingering in the memory." Kayti Burt of Paste rated the series 7.3 out of 10 and felt that "lack of narrative clarity keeps The Sound of Magic from becoming something special". Burt appreciated the direction of Kim Seong-yoon and wrote, the "dazzling visuals and the cast’s earnest performances (and solid vocals), make for an enjoyable, brief trip around this merry-go-round ride of a story."
Kate Sánchez writing for BWT rated the series with 9/10 and described it as "fantastically emotive in every way." Sánchez further wrote, "The whimsy and beauty serve as a counterbalance to the rich narrative of one young girl trying to move past her circumstance."

John Serba reviewing for Decider wrote, "The overlong episodes could be nipped and tucked here and there, but The Sound of Magic offers a fine balance of smart and silly." Serba opined, "Fans of K-stuff will probably love it." Pierce Conran of the South China Morning Post gave 3 stars out of 5 and criticised the narrative for  "surprising lack of characters, locations and even extras." Concluding his review, Conran wrote, "In the end this is a half-baked fable that could have been so much more. It’s the sound of magic without the feeling of it."

Awards and nominations

Notes

References

External links

 
 
 
 
 
 Annarasumanara at Line Webtoon
 The Sound of Magic at Daum 

Korean-language Netflix original programming
Television productions suspended due to the COVID-19 pandemic
Television series by JTBC Studios
2022 South Korean television series debuts
South Korean web series
2022 South Korean television series endings
Television shows based on South Korean webtoons
South Korean fantasy television series
South Korean musical television series
Television series about teenagers